Una Vida is the 28th album and 23rd studio album recorded by Puerto Rican singer Ednita Nazario. It was released worldwide on April 28, 2017.

Track listing

2017 albums
Ednita Nazario albums